4805 Asteropaios  is a Jupiter trojan from the Trojan camp, approximately  in diameter. It was discovered on 13 November 1990, by American astronomer Carolyn Shoemaker at the Palomar Observatory in California. The dark Jovian asteroid is one of the 80 largest Jupiter trojans and has a rotation period of 12.4 hours. It was named after the spear-throwing hero Asteropaios, from Greek mythology.

Orbit and classification 

Asteropaios is a dark Jovian asteroid orbiting in the trailering Trojan camp at Jupiter's  Lagrangian point, 60° behind on the Gas Giant's orbit in a 1:1 resonance (see Trojans in astronomy). It is also a non-family asteroid of the Jovian background population.

It orbits the Sun at a distance of 4.7–5.7 AU once every 11 years and 11 months (4,343 days; semi-major axis of 5.21 AU). Its orbit has an eccentricity of 0.09 and an inclination of 12° with respect to the ecliptic. The body's observation arc begins with a precovery taken at Palomar in December 1953, almost 37 years prior to its official discovery observation.

Physical characteristics 

Asteropaios is an assumed, carbonaceous C-type asteroid.

Rotation period 

In February 1994, a rotational lightcurve of Asteropaios was obtained from photometric observations by Stefano Mottola and Anders Erikson using the former ESO 1-metre telescope at La Silla Observatory in Chile. Lightcurve analysis gave a well-defined rotation period of  hours with a brightness amplitude of 0.26 magnitude.

Diameter and albedo 

According to the surveys carried out by the Japanese Akari satellite and the NEOWISE mission of NASA's Wide-field Infrared Survey Explorer, Asteropaios measures 43.44 and 57.65 kilometers in diameter and its surface has an albedo of 0.085 and 0.058, respectively. The Collaborative Asteroid Lightcurve Link assumes a standard albedo for a carbonaceous asteroid of 0.057 and calculates a diameter of 53.16 kilometers based on an absolute magnitude of 10.1.

Naming 

This minor planet was named from Greek mythology after Asteropaios, commander of the Trojan-allied Paeonians during the Trojan War. The ambidextrous, spear-throwing warrior was able to draw blood from Achilles but was slain in the combat. The official naming citation was published by the Minor Planet Center on 27 June 1991.

References

External links 
 Asteroid Lightcurve Database (LCDB), query form (info )
 Dictionary of Minor Planet Names, Google books
 Discovery Circumstances: Numbered Minor Planets (1)-(5000) – Minor Planet Center
 Asteroid 4805 Asteropaios at the Small Bodies Data Ferret
 
 

004805
Discoveries by Carolyn S. Shoemaker
Named minor planets
19901113